This article contains a list of 3D printers.

Metrics 
Some important 3D printer metrics include:
 Print technology: 3D printing processes encompasses a variety of methods which each have their own unique challenges.
 Length of production run and support: 3D printers often require adjustments and parts replacement. A long production run often means that spare parts are also available.
 Maximum build volume: Defines how large parts that are possible to print on a given printer. Often measured in millimeters, but sometimes in inches or centimeters instead.
 Minimum layer resolution: Defines the resolution of the print (usually the vertical resolution). Often measured in micrometers (µm). The actual resolution of a printer can usually be adjusted within an interval.
 Print speed: Defines how fast the printer is, and is usually measured in millimeters per second (mm/s). The actual speed of a printer can usually be adjusted within an interval.
 Kit or assembled: Printers are usually sold either pre-assembled, partially assembled or as complete kits. Kits are usually less expensive, but also usually require more fitting and calibration.
 Open source: Some printer designs are released into the open source domain, which can include for instance hardware specifications, CAD files, board schematics and firmware files. Open source printer designs are often popular in online do it yourself-communities.
 Noise level: Measured in decibels (dB), and can vary greatly in home-printers from 15 dB to 75 dB. Some main sources of noise in filament printers are fans, motors and bearings, while in resin printers the fans usually are responsible for most of the noise. Some methods for dampening the noise from a printer may be to install vibration isolation, use larger diameter fans, perform maintenance and lubrication, or using a soundproofing enclosure.

Commercial printers

See also 
 List of 3D printer manufacturers
 3D printing processes

References

3D